Pierre Bouteiller (1655–1717) was a French Baroque composer. His surviving works comprise 13 petits motets and a requiem for 5 voices and basso continuo.

Works, editions and recordings
 Missa pro defunctis. O felix et dilecte conviva; Tantum ergo; O salutaris hostia; O fidelis et dilecte commensalis; Consideratio de vanitate mundi. Suzie LeBlanc, Stephan van Dyck, Les Voix Humaines. Atma, 2003
 Missa pro defunctis. Glossa, 2010

References

1717 deaths
1655 births
French Baroque composers